Bryson Mitchell (born April 3, 2003) is an American professional dirt track racing driver who competes full-time in the Durrence Layne 602 Late Model Sportsman Series and previously part-time in the NASCAR Camping World Truck Series, driving the No. 46 Toyota Tundra for G2G Racing. His older brother Braden Mitchell also races.

Motorsports career results

NASCAR
(key) (Bold – Pole position awarded by qualifying time. Italics – Pole position earned by points standings or practice time. * – Most laps led.)

Camping World Truck Series

 Season still in progress

References

External links
 

2003 births
NASCAR drivers
People from Russellville, Alabama
Racing drivers from Alabama
Living people